Pierre Falardeau (December 28, 1946 – September 25, 2009) was a Québécois film and documentary director, pamphleteer and noted activist for Quebec independence.

Falardeau wrote at least one book,  Rien n'est plus précieux que la liberté et l'indépendance. He died on September 25, 2009, following a long battle with cancer. He was entombed at the Notre Dame des Neiges Cemetery in Montreal.

Political views 
With regard to minorities, Falardeau stated he did not care whether someone was white, black, yellow or green with orange polka dots; those who supported independence he considered brothers and sisters, and those who did not were "the enemy".

Falardeau created some controversy during his career. For example, in 2006, a photograph surfaced of him at an August 2006 Montreal pro-Palestinian rally about the Israel-Lebanon conflict. The picture shows Falardeau with some young men and his friend and filmmaking partner Julien Poulin holding a Hezbollah flag. When asked to comment, Falardeau responded that he approached the men to understand why they supported Hezbollah, and that the flag belonged to the young men.

Filmography
Continuons le combat - 1971
À mort - 1972
Les canadiens sont là - 1973
Le magra - 1975
À force de courage - 1977
Pea Soup - 1979
Speak White - 1980
Elvis Gratton - 1981
Les vacances d'Elvis Gratton - 1983
Pas encore Elvis Gratton! - 1985
Elvis Gratton: Le king des kings - 1985
The Party (Le Party) - 1990
The Steak (Le Steak) - 1992
Le temps des bouffons - 1993
Octobre - 1994
Elvis Gratton II: Miracle à Memphis - 1999
February 15, 1839 (15 février 1839) - 2001
Elvis Gratton 3: Le retour d'Elvis Wong - 2004
 Bob Gratton : Ma Vie, My Life - 2007-2009

Awards 

 Luc Perreault Award

See also
Cinema of Quebec
Quebec sovereignty movement

References

External links
Official website 
Unofficial website 

1946 births
French Quebecers
People from Mercier–Hochelaga-Maisonneuve
Université de Montréal alumni
Quebec sovereigntists
Male actors from Montreal
Canadian male film actors
Canadian male television actors
Canadian documentary film directors
Film directors from Montreal
Film producers from Quebec
Canadian screenwriters in French
Writers from Montreal
Canadian anthropologists
2009 deaths
Deaths from cancer in Quebec
Deaths from kidney cancer
Burials at Notre Dame des Neiges Cemetery
20th-century Canadian screenwriters
20th-century Canadian male writers
21st-century Canadian screenwriters
21st-century Canadian male writers
Canadian male screenwriters